Cassandra Ciangherotti (born 14 February 1987) is a Mexican actress and producer, best known for her role in the 2015 Mexican drama film The Hours with You, for which she was nominated for an Ariel Award for Best Supporting Actress in that same year. The following year she was nominated in the same category at the Ariel Awards, for her participation in the film Tiempos felices (2014).

Family 
Cassandra is the daughter of Fernando Luján and Adriana Parra. She is the granddaughter of the Argentine actor Alejandro Ciangherotti, and the younger sister of actors Fernando Ciangherotti and Vanessa Ciangherotti.

Filmography

Film roles

Television roles

References

External links 

 

1987 births
Living people
21st-century Mexican actresses
Mexican film actresses
People from Mexico City
Mexican people of Italian descent